3x3 basketball was introduced at the Summer Olympic Games as an official Olympic sport at 2020.

History
On 9 June 2017, the executive board of the International Olympic Committee announced that 3x3 basketball would become an official Olympic sport as of the 2020 Summer Olympics in Tokyo, Japan, for both men and women. (The 2020 Olympics was postponed to 2021 due to the COVID-19 pandemic).

Events

Men

Summary

Medal table

Participating nations

Women

Summary

Medal table

Participating nations

Medal table 
Sources:

See also

Basketball at the Summer Olympics

References

External links 
3x3 basketball at the Official website of the FIBA
3x3 basketball  at the Official website of the IOC

Olympics
Basketball
Sports at the Summer Olympics